HMHS may refer to:
 Humana Military Healthcare Services, an American military health care provider
 Her or His Majesty's Hospital Ship, a ship prefix; see List of hospitals and hospital ships of the Royal Navy

Schools 
 Haddonfield Memorial High School, Camden County, New Jersey, United States
 Haiphong Maritime High School, Haiphong, Vietnam
 Hanson Memorial High School, Franklin, Louisiana, United States
 Harvey Milk High School, New York City, United States
 Hercules Middle/High School, Hercules, California, United States